Milford New Century Club is a historic women's club house in Milford, Kent County, Delaware, USA. It was built in 1885 as a schoolhouse for the Classical Academy. It is a one-story, "T"-shaped building with a gable roof in the Late Gothic Revival style. The New Century Club was organized in 1898, and purchased the building in 1905, after meeting at the building starting in 1898 and leasing it since 1900.

It was listed on the National Register of Historic Places in 1982.

References

Clubhouses on the National Register of Historic Places in Delaware
Cultural infrastructure completed in 1885
Gothic Revival architecture in Delaware
Buildings and structures in Kent County, Delaware
Milford, Delaware
National Register of Historic Places in Kent County, Delaware